Mark V. Olsen (born 1962) is an American television producer and screenwriter. He was the co-creator and executive producer of the HBO series Big Love and Getting On  along with his writing partner and husband Will Scheffer. In 2007, Olsen and Scheffer won a TV Writers Guild of America Award for the pilot episode of Big Love.

Overview
Olsen grew up in Hastings, Nebraska. He is also an attorney, and a member of the New York bar.

Olsen is openly gay; since the early 1990s, he and professional partner Will Scheffer have also been married to each other.

Prior to the television show Big Love, Olsen co-produced the independent feature-length movie Easter (2002), which was originally written as a play by Scheffer. Olsen also wrote a six-part miniseries for HBO known as Mary Chestnut's Civil War.

References

External links
 

American male screenwriters
American soap opera writers
American television producers
American gay writers
Writers Guild of America Award winners
Place of birth missing (living people)
Living people
1962 births
LGBT people from Nebraska
New York (state) lawyers
People from Hastings, Nebraska
LGBT producers
Showrunners
American male television writers
Screenwriters from Nebraska